Bengescu is a Romanian surname. Notable people with the surname include:

George Bengescu-Dabija (1844–1916), writer
Gheorghe Bengescu (1848–1922), diplomat and literary historian
Hortensia Papadat-Bengescu (1876–1955), writer, niece of George

Romanian-language surnames